Proline aminopeptidase may refer to:

 Prolyl aminopeptidase, an enzyme
 X-Pro aminopeptidase, an enzyme